Charlie Mitchell may refer to:
 Charlie Mitchell (baseball) (born 1962), American baseball player
 Charlie Mitchell (footballer) (born 1948), Scottish American soccer player and coach
 Charlie Mitchell (American football) (1920–1999), American football player
 Charlie Mitchell (EastEnders), a fictional character on BBC soap opera Easatenders

See also 
 Charley Mitchell (disambiguation)
 Charles Mitchell (disambiguation)